Jay Kappraff is an American professor of mathematics at the New Jersey Institute of Technology and author.

Biography
Kappraff was trained in engineering, physical sciences and mathematics, earning a B.Ch.E. in chemical engineering at New York Polytechnic in 1958. He went on to be awarded a PhD in applied mathematics in 1974 from the Courant Institute of Mathematical Science, New York University and a M.S. in chemical engineering in 1960 from Iowa State University. He began work for DuPont DeNemours as a chemical engineer from 1961 to 1962 going on to teach mathematics for a brief period before obtaining a position at NASA as an aerospace engineer from 1962 until 1965. He went on to be an instructor of mathematics at the Cooper Union College, New York City from 1968 until 1974. Following this, he joined the New Jersey Institute of Technology, where he currently works. He was a consultant for the Department of Energy in 1976. In 1978 he developed a course in the mathematics of design for computer scientists, mathematicians and architects. In bringing together such an interdisciplinary range of subjects, he began to study what he termed a common language of design and geometry. He has been a prolific lecturer on the relationship between art and science and published a large number or articles on subjects ranging from plasma physics, solar heating, aerospace engineering and fractals. He has also published a number of books on these and related subjects and compiled a series of video lectures on the science of design. He is a skilled musician and a member of a Baroque ensemble, President of a local civic group and has organized a Chamber Music Workshop writing and directing a program entitled The Musicians and Artists of Terezin. He has also assisted a task force to improve voting machines in New Jersey. His other interests include playing violin and tennis, listening to chamber music and practicing t'ai chi.

In 1991 his book Connections won a prize for the best book in chemistry, physics, mathematics, astronomy and reference from the Association of American Publishers.

Professional activities
At the NJIT, Kapraff has organized various forums and tuition programs on subjects from Nuclear war and ancient geometry to experimental mathematics. he is a member of the faculty council and chairman of the NJIT Technology and Society Forum committee. He is a member of the Mathematics Association of America and on the editorial board of a new interdisciplinary journal, the International Journal of Biological Systems. He was also guest editor of the journal FORMA for a special issue on the golden mean in 2005.

Selected bibliography
 Kappraff, J. "Ancient Harmonic Law".  Bridges 2007.  (2007)
 Kappraff, J. "The Lost Harmonic Law of the Bible".  Proceedings of London-Bridges 2006.  Edited by J. Sharp.
 Kappraff, J. and McClain, E.G.  "The Proportions of the Parthenon: A work of musically inspired architecture".  Music in Art: International Journal for Music Iconography, Vol. 30/1–2 (Spring–Fall 2005)
 Kappraff, J. In Search of the Golden Mean.  FORMA Vol. 19, No. 4 (2005)
 Kappraff, J. Growth of Plants: A Study in Number. FORMA Vol 19, No. 4 (2005).
 Kappraff, J. and Adamson, G.W. Generalized Binet Formulas, Lucas Polynomials, and Cyclic Constants.  FORMA vol. 19, No. 4 (2005)
 Kappraff, J., Jablan, S., Adamson, G.W., Sazdanovich, R. Golden Fields, Generalized Fibonacci Sequences, and Chaotic Matrices.  FORMA vol. 19, No. 4 (2005).
 Kappraff, J. and Adamson, G.W. Polygons and Chaos.  Journal of Biological Systems and Geometric Theories, Vol. 2 pp 79–94 (Nov. 2004).
 Kappraff, J. The Anatomy of a Bud.  In Bridges:2004 edited by R. Sarhangi.  Winfield,KS:Central Plains books (2004)
 Kappraff, J. and Adamson, G.W.  The Relationship of the Cotangent Function to Special Relativity Theory, Silver Means, p-cycles, and Chaos Theory.  FORMA.  Vol.18, No. 3, pp 249–262 (2003)
 Kappraff, J. The Anatomy of a Bud.  In Bridges:2004 edited by R. Sarhangi.  Winfield,KS:Central Plains books (2004)
 Kappraff, J. and Adamson, G.W. Polygons and Chaos.  Journal of Dynamical Systems and Geometric Theories, Vol. 2 pp 79–94 (Nov. 2004).
 Kappraff, J. Complexity and Chaos Theory in Art.  Chaos and Complexity Letters, Vol 3.  Special Issue on Chaos and Complexity in Arts and Architecture.  In press.
 Kappraff, J. and McClain,E.  The System of Proportions of the Parthenon: A Work of Musically Inspired Architecture.  Music in Art: International Journal of Music Iconography, Vol. 30 (2005), 5-16.
 Kappraff, J and Adamson, G.W.  A Unified Theory of Proportion.  Conference Proceedings of ISAMA-Bridges 2003. J. Barrallo, et al. editors (2003) and in Journal of Visual Mathematics
 Kappraff, J. "The System of Proportions of the Parthenon and its Meaning". Proceedings of the 5th Bridges Conference, ed. by R. Sarhangi (2002).
 Kappraff and Adamson, G.W. "Polygons and Chaos".  Symmetry : Art and Science No. 1/2 (2001).
 Kappraff, J. "Beyond Measure: Essays in Nature Myth, and Number". 600 pages., Singapore: World Scientific In press. (2002)
 Kappraff, J. "A Secret of Ancient Geometry."  In Geometry at, Work edited by C.Gorini. Mathematics Association of American Geometry MAA Notes No. 53 (2000)
 Kappraff, J. and Hawkins, G. "The Music of the Spheres: Was Kepler Wrong?” unpublished.
 Kappraff, J. and Adamson, G.W. "A Fresh Look at Number". Visual Mathematics (an electronic journal, Vol. 2, No. 3 Fall 2000.
 Kappraff, J. "The Arithmetic of Nicomachus of Gerasa and its Applications to Systems of Proportion" Nexus Network Journal Vol. 4, No. 3 October 2000.
 Kappraff, J. "The Hidden Pavements of Michelangelo’s Laurentian Library".  Article in the Mathematical Tourist section of Mathematical Intelligencer. June 1999.
 Kappraff, J. "Systems of Proportion in Design and Architecture and their relationship to Dynamical Systems". In Visual Mathematics (an electronic journal). Issue 1. Feb. 1999.
 Kappraff, J., Blackmore, D., and Adamson, G. "Phyllotaxis asDynamical System: A Study in Number." In Symmetry in Plants edited by R.V. Jean and D. Barabe.  Singapore: World Scientific. In print (1996).
 Kappraff, J. "Musical Proportions at the Basis of Architectural Proportions both Ancient and Modern." In Nexus '96 edited by K. Williams.  Fuccechio: Edizioni Dell' Erba. In print (1996).
 Kappraff, J. "Linking the Musical Proportions of Renaissance, the Modulor, and Roman Systems of Proportions." Space Structures, Vol. 11, Nos. 1 and 2 (1996).
 Blackmore, D. and Kappraff, J. "Phyllotaxis and Toral Dynamical Systems." Journal of Applied Mathematics and Mechanics (1995).
 Kappraff, J. "Tangrams, Amish Quilts, and Sacred Geometry". SIAM Newsletter in Discrete Mathematics. May 1993.
 Kappraff, J. "Connections: The Geometric Bridge between Art and Science " 470 pages. New York: McGraw–Hill. 1991.
 Kappraff, J. "The Relationship between Mathematics and Mysticism of the Golden Mean through History."  In Five-fold Symmetry in a Cultural Context edited by Istvan Hargittai. Singapore: World Scientific.  1991.
 Kappraff, J. "The Spiral in Myth, Mathematics, and Nature." In Spiral Symmetry edited by I. Hargittai and C.A. Pickover. Singapore:World Scientific. 1991.
 Kappraff, J. "A Course in the Mathematics of Design." In Symmetry:Unifying Human Understanding. Edited by I. Hargittai.  Pergamon Press. 1986.
 Kappraff, J. "The Geometry of Coastlines: A study in Fractals." In Symmetry: Unifying Human Understanding edited by I. Hargittai. Pergamon Press. 1986.

References

External links
 NJIT – Professor Jay Kappraff, Department of Mathematics
 Professor Jay Kappraff, personal details
 youtube.com – Jay Kappraff – A new course in the mathematics of design

20th-century American mathematicians
21st-century American mathematicians
American non-fiction writers
University of Iowa alumni
Polytechnic Institute of New York University alumni
People from New Jersey
Living people
Year of birth missing (living people)